Our Lady of Ransom Church may refer to:

 Basilica of Our Lady of Ransom or Vallarpadam Church, Vallarpadam-Ernakulam, Kochi, India
 Our Lady of Ransom Church, Kanyakumari, Tamil Nadu, India
 Our Lady of Ransom Church, Eastbourne, East Sussex, United Kingdom

See also
 Feast of Our Lady of Ransom